Circaea × decipiens is a hybrid of flowering plants in the evening primrose family Onagraceae. The parents of the hybrid are Circaea erubescens and Circaea canadensis subsp. quadrisulcata.

References

decipiens
Plant nothospecies